Kettle Falls is a city in Stevens County, Washington, United States, named for the nearby Kettle Falls on the Kettle River. The city itself is located on the Colville River immediately upstream from its confluence with the Columbia River. The population of the city was 1,595 at the time of the 2010 census, a 4.5% increase over the 2000 census.

History
The original Kettle Falls was officially incorporated on December 17, 1891 on the bank of the Columbia. After it was flooded by the Grand Coulee Dam in 1940, city planners relocated the town at a community called Meyers Falls, near the railroad lines, helping to ensure its success as a trans-shipment point for the logging, agriculture, and paper industries. This is its present location, eight miles northwest of Colville and roughly 80 miles northwest of Spokane.

Geography

Demographics

2010 census
As of the census of 2010, there were 1,595 people, 676 households, and 419 families living in the city. The racial makeup of the city was 90.9% White, 0.1% African American, 2.0% Native American, 0.4% Asian, 0.1% Pacific Islander, 0.6% from other races, and 5.9% from two or more races. Hispanic or Latino of any race were 1.7% of the population.

There were 676 households, of which 31.2% had children under the age of 18 living with them, 44.7% were married couples living together, 12.3% had a female householder with no husband/wife present, 5.0% had a male householder with no wife/husband present, and 38.0% were non-families. 31.7% of all households were made up of individuals, and 13.8% had someone living alone who was 65 years of age or older. The average household size was 2.35 and the average family size was 2.95.

The median age in the city was 38.6 years. 26.6% of residents were under the age of 18; 7.6% were between the ages of 18 and 24; 23.9% were from 25 to 44; 25.4% were from 45 to 64; and 16.3% were 65 years of age or older. The gender makeup of the city was 47.6% male and 52.4% female.

2000 census
As of the census of 2000, there were 1,527 people, 632 households, and 398 families living in the city. The population density was 1,631.1 people per square mile (627.2/km2). There were 686 housing units at an average density of 732.8 per square mile (281.8/km2). The racial makeup of the city was 91.29% White, 0.07% African American, 3.86% Native American, 0.20% Asian, 0.07% Pacific Islander, 0.65% from other races, and 3.86% from two or more races. Hispanic or Latino of any race were 2.75% of the population.

There were 632 households, out of which 33.7% had children under the age of 18 living with them, 47.2% were married couples living together, 11.2% had a female householder with no husband present, and 37.0% were non-families. 31.8% of all households were made up of individuals, and 14.4% had someone living alone who was 65 years of age or older. The average household size was 2.42 and the average family size was 3.05.

In the city, the age distribution of the population shows 29.4% under the age of 18, 8.3% from 18 to 24, 25.9% from 25 to 44, 20.5% from 45 to 64, and 15.8% who were 65 years of age or older. The median age was 34 years. For every 100 females, there were 95.8 males. For every 100 females age 18 and over, there were 92.2 males.

The median income for a household in the city was $27,031, and the median income for a family was $34,375. Males had a median income of $33,750 versus $23,750 for females. The per capita income for the city was $13,614. About 15.1% of families and 21.1% of the population were below the poverty line, including 26.0% of those under age 18 and 12.9% of those age 65 or over.

Notable people
 Cathy McMorris Rodgers, U.S. representative for  since 2005
 James Darling, NFL player from 1997 to 2006

See also
 St. Paul's Mission
 Fort Colvile
 Old Apple Warehouse

References

External links
 Official City of Kettle Falls website
 Stevens County Heritage From the Libraries of Stevens County. Includes a collection of materials depicting early Kettle Falls and Meyers Falls.

Cities in Washington (state)
Cities in Stevens County, Washington
Washington (state) populated places on the Columbia River
Populated places established in 1940
Hudson's Bay Company trading posts